The 2022 Copa Bolivia was the 28th edition of the Copa Bolivia, Bolivia's domestic football cup competition organized by the Bolivian Football Federation (FBF), held for the first time since 2002. Ninety-four teams from the División Profesional and regional leagues were slated to take part in the competition, which started on 21 April with its regional preliminary stages and was scheduled to end on 3 November 2022.

The champions were entitled to qualify for the 2023 Copa Sudamericana, taking the Bolivia 2 berth for that competition, as well as the 2022 Supercopa Bolivia and would also earn a prize of US$ 500,000.

The competition was cancelled by the FBF on 18 July 2022, prior to the start of the national stage, after 28 out of the 32 teams that qualified failed to fully comply with the established requirements.

Format
The competition consisted of a preliminary stage and a national stage. In the preliminary stage, which was contested on a regional basis, the teams from each regional association took part in a knockout tournament which qualified one team from each regional league to the national stage, where they would join the 16 División Profesional teams (including the two promoted teams for the 2022 season), along with the other six quarter-finalists of the 2021 Copa Simón Bolívar, and the losing team of the 2021 promotion/relegation play-off (Real Potosí) to make a field of 32 teams.

For the national stage, which was not played, the 16 Primera División clubs would be drawn against a rival from the División Aficionados (Copa Simón Bolívar or regional league) into 16 double-legged ties in which the lower-tier team would host the first leg, with the 16 winners advancing to the round of 16. The subsequent rounds (round of 16, quarter-finals, and semi-finals) would also be played as double-legged ties, while the final would be played as a single game on neutral ground.

Teams

Preliminary stage
Teams from the Bolivian Football Regional Leagues took part in various department-based preliminary rounds to win one of the 9 places in the national stage (round of 32). The first matches of the preliminary rounds began in April 2022, with the final matches of the preliminary rounds being played on 14 July 2022.

See also
2022 Bolivian Primera División season

References

Copa Bolivia seasons
Bolivia
C